Hairpick is the third studio album by guitarist Blues Saraceno, released on September 4, 1994 through Guitar Recordings. Following the recording of this album, Saraceno joined hard rock band, Poison.

Track listing

Personnel
Blues Saraceno – vocals, guitar, bass, engineering, mixing, production
Dweezil Zappa – guitar (track 9)
Josh Freese – drums
Alex Saraceno – engineering, mixing
Doug Sax – mastering
John Stix – production

References

Blues Saraceno albums
1994 albums